Andromeda is a  luxury expedition yacht constructed for the New Zealand billionaire Graeme Hart. Launched in 2015 and completed in 2016, the vessel was initially named Ulyssess by Hart. The vessel was reportedly sold in 2017 to Yuri Milner and renamed Andromeda.

Description

The ship is equipped with three 550 kW Caterpillar C18 electric generators for power generation. Andromeda is equipped with a helipad and hangar for a helicopter.

The yacht's interior was designed by H2 Yacht Design and the exterior, Oscar Mike Naval Architecture. The vessel has a crew of 43, has 15 staterooms and capacity for 30 passengers.

Construction and career
The yacht was constructed by Kleven Maritime AS with the yard number 366 for New Zealand billionaire Graeme Hart, under the name Ulysses. The vessel was launched in 2015 and was completed in 2016. The 107-meter Ulysses arrived in Bremerhaven, Germany in August 2015, where she was finished at Stahlbau Nord, under supervision of Dörries Maritime Services.

The yacht was sold to an unnamed buyer in October 2017 by Fraser Yachts. In March 2018, her name was changed to Andromeda. During 2017-2018, the vessel spent the winter months of the northern hemisphere completing sea trials, then set sail across the Pacific, arriving in Singapore on 6 March. 

Andromedas builder, Kleven, built a second expedition yacht for Hart,  in length. The vessel is also named  and was delivered in late 2017.

Ownership
When Hart sold Andromeda, it was widely reported that Yuri Milner purchased her.  While some sources still maintain, with evidence, that Milner is the owner, a spokesperson for him has since denied it. In March of 2022, Forbes reported Andromeda as owned by Milner, that she was registered in the Cayman Islands, and she was valued at US$129 million. On April 13, 2022, she was recorded in the Seychelles.

See also
 List of motor yachts by length

References

External link

2015 ships
Motor yachts
Ships built in Ulstein
Ships built in Norway
Yuri Milner